Toussieu is a commune in the Rhône department in eastern France. Since 2001, Paul Vidal has been the mayor of Toussieu. He was re-elected in the 2020 municipal elections.

See also
Communes of the Rhône department

References

Communes of Rhône (department)